Randolph Schwabe (9 May 1885 – 19 September 1948) was a British draughtsman, painter and etcher who was the Slade Professor of Fine Art at University College London from 1930 until his death. He served as a war artist in both World Wars, created designs for theatrical productions and illustrated a number of books.

Early life

Schwabe was born in Eccles, Greater Manchester, the youngest of two sons to Octavie Henriette Ermen and Lawrence Schwabe, a cotton merchant whose father had emigrated from Germany in 1820. The family moved several times before settling in Hemel Hempstead, Hertfordshire, where Lawrence Schwabe opened a printing and stationery business. Randolph was educated at a private school in Hemel Hempstead and from an early age showed a talent for drawing. In 1899, aged fourteen, he was enrolled at the Royal College of Art but was unhappy there and within a few months had transferred to the Slade School of Fine Art. In 1904 Schwabe won a Slade Scholarship and in 1905 won the college Summer Competition Prize. In 1906, a Slade scholarship allowed him to study at the Académie Julian in Paris before travelling to Italy in 1908. Working in Rome and Florence he gained a deep knowledge of Italian art and architecture. Work by Schwabe was shown at the New English Art Club in 1909 and he became a member in 1917, having become a member of the London Group in 1915. In April 1913 Schwabe married Gwendolen Jones and they were to have one daughter.

Career

During the First World War, Schwabe served as an official war artist, as poor health had prevented him enlisting, and he mainly produced paintings and drawings of the work done by the Women's Land Army. After the war he began to teach at both the Camberwell School of Art and the Westminster School of Art. In 1930 he succeeded Henry Tonks as Slade Professor of Fine Art at University College and as Principal of the Slade School of Fine Art.

Schwabe's work was widely exhibited and he also created designs for theatrical productions and illustrated a number of books, including Historic Costume (1925) and A Short History of Costume and Armour (1931), both with F. M. Kelly. Other books illustrated by Schwabe included Crossings (1921) by Walter de la Mare, The Tinkers of Elstow (1946) by H E Bates and several books by the dance historian Cyril W. Beaumont. As well as illustrating several books for the Beaumont Press, Schwabe also designed a set of wooden figures based on dancers from the Sergei Diaghilev company, the Ballets Russes for Beaumont.

In 1941 Schwabe joined the committee of the War Artists' Advisory Committee and was also given a short commission to produce pieces for their collection. This included a commission to record the bomb damage to Coventry Cathedral in November 1940. In 1942 Schwabe was elected a member of the Royal Society of Painters in Watercolours, having been elected an associate of the Society in 1938. A columnist for the Chicago Daily Tribune nominated Schwabe for a Pulitzer Prize in 1943 for his cover illustration to The Old Churches of London by Gerald Cobb but had to write to the book's publishers to explain that he had been humorous as no such prize existed.

Although he remained Principal of the Slade, he moved to Helensburgh in Dunbartonshire for health reasons and he died there in September 1948.

Legacy

Works by Schwabe are held in several major collections; the Imperial War Museum has examples of his war-time commissions from both the First and Second World Wars. The Arts Council toured a major retrospective of his work in 1951. Schwabe's ashes are interred in the churchyard of St John-at-Hampstead in Hampstead, over which stands a small statue of an angel by the sculptor Alan Durst. The angel wears a sash with the legend, Randolph Schwabe in whose life we have seen excellence in beauty.

Books illustrated
Books illustrated by Schwabe included
Crossings by Walter de la Mare, Beaufort Press, 1921
A Manual of the Theory and Practice of Classical Theatrical Dancing by C. W. Beaumont, Beaumont Press, 1922
After Berneval Letters of Oscar Wilde and Robert Ross by Oscar Wilde, Beaumont Press, 1922
To Nature by Edmund Blunden, Beaumont Press, 1923
The Café Royal by A. Symons, Beaumont Press, 1923
Madrigals and Chronicles by J. Claire, Beaumont Press, 1924
Masks of Time, Edmund Blunden, Beaumont Press, 1925
Historic Costume 1490–1790 by F. M. Kelly, Batsford, 1925
The Carwen Press Almanack, 1926
The Actor by R.Lloyd, Beaumont Press, 1926
The First Score by C. W. Beaumont, Beaumont Press, 1927
The Wet Flanders Plain by H. Williamson, Beaumont Press, 1929
The Theory and Practice of Allegro in Classical Ballet by C. W. Beaumont, Beaumont Press, 1930
A Summer Fancy, Edmund Blunden, Beaumont Press, 1930
A Short History of Costume and Armour 1066-1800 by F. M. Kelly, Batsford, 1931
To Themis by Edmund Blunden, Beaumont Press, 1931
Of Human Bondage by W. Somerset Maugham, Heinemann, 1936
The Tinkers of Elstow by H. E. Bates, privately published, 1946
English Church Monuments by Katharine Esdaile, Batsford, 1946

References

External links

 

1885 births
1948 deaths
20th-century English male artists
20th-century English painters
Academics of Camberwell College of Arts
Academics of the Slade School of Fine Art
Académie Julian alumni
Alumni of the Slade School of Fine Art
British draughtsmen
British war artists
Burials at St John-at-Hampstead
English illustrators
English male painters
People from Eccles, Greater Manchester
World War I artists
World War II artists